The Tower of Sagone is a ruined Genoese tower located in the commune of Vico (Corse-du-Sud) on the west coast of the Corsica. The tower sits on the west side of the Anse de Sagone.

The tower was built in 1581 and replaced an earlier tower. It was one of a series of coastal defences constructed by the Republic of Genoa between 1530 and 1620 to stem the attacks by Barbary pirates. The tower is privately owned and in 1974 was listed as one of the official historical monuments of France.

Gallery

See also
List of Genoese towers in Corsica

Notes and references

External links
 
 Includes information on how to reach 90 towers and many photographs.

Towers in Corsica
Monuments historiques of Corsica